Asian Highway 8 (AH8) is a road in the Asian Highway Network running 4907 km (3050 miles) from  Torfyanovka, Russia to Bandar-e Shahpour, Iran. The route is as follows:

Russia
: - Torfyanovka - Vyborg - Saint Petersburg
 (or ): Saint Petersburg - Moscow
: Moscow - Kashira
: Kashira - Tambov - Volgograd - Astrakhan
: Astrakhan - Kochubey - Kizlyar - Babayurt
: Babayurt - Khasavyurt - Makhachkala - border with Azerbaijan

Azerbaijan
 M1 Highway: Samur - Sumgayit - Baku
 Baku Ring: Baku
 M3 Highway: Baku - Ələt - Biləsuvar - Astara

Iran
  Road 49:  Astara - Rasht
 Freeway 1: Rasht - Qazvin
 Freeway 2: Qazvin - Tehran
 Freeway 5: Tehran - Saveh - Salafchegan
  Road 56: Salafchegan - Arak - Borujerd
  Road 37: Borujerd - Khorramabad
 Freeway 5: Khorramabad - Andimeshk
  Road 37: Andimeshk - Ahvaz
 Freeway 5: Ahvaz - Bandar-e Emam Khomeyni
(When sections under construction are completed:  Freeway 5: Tehran - Saveh - Salafchegan - Arak - Borujerd - Khorramabad - Andimeshk - Ahvaz - Bandar-e Emam Khomeyni)

References

External links 

 Iran road map on Young Journalists Club

Asian Highway Network
Roads in Russia
Roads in Azerbaijan
Roads in Iran